Moira Deady, Mrs Hoey (13 March 1922 – 15 November 2010) was an Irish actress.

She starred as Mary Riordan, "the quintessential Irish mammy", in The Riordans from 1965 until the show was cancelled in 1979. She later appeared as Nellie Connors in Glenroe. She played Mrs Coffey in The Irish R.M. She had roles in such films as This Is My Father and Angela's Ashes (as the grandmother.

Raised in Cork City, County Cork, she later resided in Greystones, County Wicklow. She began acting by traveling around Ireland as part of fit-ups (traveling theatre troupes).

She was a member of Equity Players in 1946, who toured a programme of Abbey Theatre and other famous plays.

In 1954, she married fellow The Riordans actor John "Johnny" Hoey (who played "Francie Maher"). John Hoey died on 10 August 1978, aged 69. The couple had four children, Kevin, Mary, Bernadette, and Brenda. Fans often thought she was married in real life to actor John Cowley who played "Tom Riordan", her television husband.

In 2009, she reunited with the cast members of the rural drama The Riordans for an RTÉ documentary on the programme. She was one of a small number of Riordans actors to work on both its successor series Bracken and Glenroe.

Death
She died, aged 88, on 15 November 2010 in Loughlinstown Hospital, County Dublin. Minister for Tourism, Culture and Sport Mary Hanafin commented on her part in Irish history: "In her role as the matriarch of The Riordans homestead, she was ever present, each Sunday, on our television screens dealing with the changing landscape and domestic issues that Ireland as a country was experiencing".

John Boland, writing in the Irish Independent, called her "everyone's mammy and the conscience of a nation" while reflecting that her death meant all the senior cast members of The Riordans were now deceased.

Hundreds attended her funeral on 18 November at Holy Rosary Church, Greystones.

Roles

Film
 The Nephew (1998) as Birdie
 This Is My Father (1998) as Mrs. Kearney
 Angela's Ashes (1999) as Mrs. Purcell
 Headrush (2003) as Mrs. Macroom
 The Tiger's Tail (2006) as Maeve, Liam's mother (final film role)

Television
 The Riordans (1972-1979) as Mary Riordan
 Bracken (1981) 
 The Irish R.M. (1984) as Mrs. Coffey
 Glenroe (1997) as Nellie Connors
 Legend (2006) as Mrs. Gallagher

Theatre
 Wild Goose - Hannah Power

References

External links
 
 Moira Deady at the Teresa Deevy Archive 
 Obituary, irishtimes.com, 20 November 2010

1922 births
2010 deaths
Irish film actresses
Irish soap opera actresses
Irish television actresses
Actresses from Cork (city)
People from Greystones